Quest for Saddam is a first-person shooter video game released by Petrilla Entertainment on May 14, 2003. With a gameplay style similar to Doom and a humorous approach to the plot, the goal is to fight Iraqi soldiers and eventually to kill Saddam Hussein. The game was later modded by the Global Islamic Media Front (an al-Qaeda propaganda organization) in Quest for Bush, which changed the game's premise to kill the game's boss, President George W. Bush.

See also

 Quest for Bush

References

External links
 Quest for Bush / Quest for Saddam: Content vs. Context - 2006-09-26 review from Gameology.org

2003 video games
First-person shooters
Torque (game engine) games
Windows games
Windows-only games
Propaganda video games
Cultural depictions of Saddam Hussein
Video games based on real people
Video games developed in the United States
Single-player video games